Tyrell Cuffy (born 6 September 1988) is a Caymanian sprinter.

Born in Trinidad and Tobago, Cuffy moved to the Caymans at a young age, and attended John Gray High School in George Town. He then studied at King College (in Bristol, Tennessee) on an athletic scholarship, winning both the 100 and 200-metre events at the 2008 NAIA National Track Championships. Cuffy had earlier won a silver medal in the 200 metres at the 2007 Pan American Junior Athletics Championships. He has since competed for the Caymans in a number of international events and meets, notably winning two gold medals (in the 100 and 200 metres) at the 2015 Island Games.

In his youth, Cuffy also represented the national under-19 cricket team, including at the 2005 ICC Americas Under-19 Championship. His father, Theo Cuffy, played first-class cricket in Trinidad and Tobago, and came to the Cayman Islands to coach the sport.<ref>First Citizens Sports Foundation > Athletes > Theodore Cuffy – First Citizens Sports Foundation. Retrieved 19 March 2016.</

References

External links

1988 births
Living people
Caymanian cricketers
Caymanian male sprinters
Trinidad and Tobago emigrants to the Cayman Islands
Commonwealth Games competitors for the Cayman Islands
Athletes (track and field) at the 2014 Commonwealth Games